The Internet Privacy Act is a non-existent and fictitious law cited by websites that conduct illegal activities in order to deter organizations that look to prosecute such activities. Networks which share music, films and software, for example, often display the fictitious act in an attempt to protect themselves from arrest by being able to claim entrapment in court. In the statement, websites claim that it prevents organizations which may be associated with anti-P2P or government organizations from entering the site or network as it would breach the terms of the act.

According to the statement which many sites display, it was signed by Bill Clinton in 1995, but in reality he never signed the act as it never existed. Using this and other such "disclaimers" would actually make it easier for such a site to be found via the major search engines.

The text notice on these sites are usually as follows, but can vary:

History of usage 
The false act was first displayed during the late 1990s on many sites that engaged in illegal activities, such as the promotion and distribution of "knock-off" (counterfeit) materials. Over time, the paragraph was picked up and copied and pasted with the exception of a few minor variations to match the content of the containing website. An example is provided below:

Through the turn of the century, thousands of web, FTP, and other sites used the statement in an attempt to deter authorities. It is sometimes still seen in modern file sharing networks and protocols. Other reasons for it might have been to reassure the visiting public that their actions and data would be somehow protected.

References 

File sharing
Urban legends
Copyright infringement
Fictional laws